Vijay Eswaran (born 7 October 1960) is a Malaysian businessman and the executive chairman of the QI Group, headquartered in Hong Kong.

Early life 
Eswaran was born in Penang, Malaysia to Penangite Indian parents of minority Ceylonese Tamil descent, namely Pushpavathy Chinnaiah, a teacher and Vijayaratnam Saravanamuthu, founder of the Malaysian Hindu Youth Organisation. Vijay has a younger brother named Vignesh.

Vijay Eswaran financed his tertiary education in the UK  by working as a cab driver. After graduating with a degree in socio-economics from LSE (London School of Economics) in 1984, he traveled around Europe for a year, where he did a series of odd jobs. During his travels he spent over a month in a Franciscan monastery, where he took a 33-day vow of silence. This experience stands at the core of his first book, In the Sphere of Silence. In 1985, he returned to the UK, where he learned about binary system marketing and obtained professional qualification from CIMA (Chartered Institute of Management Accountants). In 1986 he traveled to the US where he obtained an MBA from the Southern Illinois University in 1986. He was involved in multilevel marketing (MLM) on a part-time basis while working for Systematics, a subsidiary of IBM.

It wasn't until his return to Malaysia–13 years after leaving it–where he was approached by the Cosway Group to start its Philippines business, that he began looking at the direct selling industry more seriously.

QI group 
In 1998, after his return to Asia, he co-founded a direct selling company that grew and expand into QI Group, an e-commerce based conglomerate with businesses in travel, media, telecommunications, luxury products, wellness, training, and corporate investments. QI Group has regional offices in Hong Kong, Singapore, Thailand and Malaysia and a presence in nearly 10 countries through a wide range of subsidiary companies.

QI City 
In 2017 Vijay Eswaran and Green Venture Capital, a subsidiary of QI Group began the development of Qi City, a RM 1.2 billion commercial and residential development, in Bandar Meru Raya, Ipoh, Perak, Malaysia. Set for completion in 2020, the project is also expected to include a teaching hospital that will offer a combination of private and public medical services. Vijay Eswaran is Chairman of the Council of the Quest International University (QIUP), which is also part of QI City. The university was founded in 2008 and is owned by the State Government of Perak and QI Group.

Books 
 In the Sphere of Silence (2005)
 In the Thinking Zone (2010)
 18 Stepping Stones (2011)
 On the Wings of Thought (2011)
 Two Minutes from the Abyss (2016)

Controversies 

In March 2006 Vijay Eswaran, and his business partners Joseph Bismark, Tagumpay Kintanar and Donna Marie Imson were accused of allegedly defrauding two Filipinos of more than $100,000 in a Gold Quest pyramid scheme. They were charged before the Quezon City Regional Trial Court of syndicated estafa, which was a non-bailable offence on the basis of a criminal complaint. In April 2006 Judge Bayani Vargas ordered the issuance of arrest warrants against the four accused. The Department of Justice, Office of the City Prosecutor later dropped the charges following a Jakarta courts dismissal of the extradition request from the National Bureau of Investigation and citing it to be a civil liability and not a criminal case.

In May 2007 a dispute in Manila, Philippines filed by two former partners of the original founding team escalated to an alleged 'offence' leading to an Interpol Red alert listing the four directors. Interpol put out a warrant for their arrest and the case was fought out substantially in the courts of Manila and Jakarta. The Goldquest executives had asked the Philippines Supreme Court to stop the Quezeon City Regional Court trial pending resolution of a petition for review. After three weeks, Indonesian courts released Vijay Eswaran; a Manila court dismissed the charge soon afterward.

A 2003 charge against Gold Quest for its fraudulent activities in Chennai, India, reached the Supreme Court, which in 2014 allowed the quashing of the proceedings. The Supreme Court appointed a one-man commission, a retired Judge of the Madras High Court, to settle all legitimate claims of around 200 depositors.

In 2009 money circulation charges were brought against Gold Quest by Tamil Nadu police. The Chennai Enforcement Directorate, attached Gold Quest properties worth 150 crore to the case under Prevention of Money Laundering Act. Though there is a Red Corner notice pending against Eswaran, he is yet to be arrested and brought to India. In an interview about the charges, Vijay Eswaran has denied any wrongdoing, and dismissed the claims as being indicative of corruption and poor journalistic standards in India. Qnet has also stated that Vijay Eswaran is neither director, nor shareholder of Qnet's franchise in India (Vihaan Direct Selling Pvt. Ltd.).

In August 2013, Times of India reported that Vijay Eswaran was being investigated by the Economic Offences wing in regards to Qnet, which he founded. The Economic Offences Wing issued lookout notice against Eswaran and a few others, after he failed to appear before the authorities for questioning. Police have frozen six of Qnet's bank accounts in the country. QNet has refuted the allegations fully in stating that its operations are legal, compliant and transparent.

In 2014 the Enforcement Directorate in 2014 has alleged money laundering against Vijay Eswaran and his company Qnet. This allegation has been refuted by both the company QNet and Vijay Eswaran.

In 2016, after 3 years of probe, the Economic Offences Wing of the Mumbai Police issues lookout notices against 30 people in connection with the Qnet Scam. As founder of Qnet, Vijay Eswaran was featured as the key accused in the case.

In 2017, Justice DP Surana of the Maharashtra Protection of Interest of Depositors (MPID) court said that prima facie the business of Qnet in India, was not legal. However the Supreme Court granted conditional bail to Michael Ferreira and Malcolm Nozer Desai on the condition they do not leave India, shareholders of Vihaan Direct Selling Pvt Ltd, a franchise of Qnet in India. Both were directed to cooperate with the investigations. The court also called a halt on all legal proceedings related to the 19 first information reports filed by the police in 2013.

In February 2018 Qnet was prosecuted for fraud and forgery at trial court of Labe, Somalia. Later that year spokesperson of the Bharatiya Janta Party called out Ex-Chief Minister of Karnataka, Siddaramaiah, for meeting with Vijay Eswaran, whom he referred to as a "declared absconder", during the World Economic Forum in China, in 2013.

Personal life 
He is married to Umayal Eswaran who is the Chairperson of the Vijayaratnam Foundation, which is CSR initiatives of the QI Group.

References

External links 
 Vijay Eswaran Official Site
 QI Group

Alumni of the London School of Economics
Malaysian businesspeople
Malaysian people of Indian descent
Malaysian people of Sri Lankan Tamil descent
Malaysian people of Tamil descent
People from Penang
Living people
1960 births
Southern Illinois University alumni